In modern heraldry, a royal cypher is a monogram or monogram-like device of a country's reigning sovereign, typically consisting of the initials of the monarch's name and title, sometimes interwoven and often surmounted by a crown. Such a cypher as used by an emperor or empress is called an imperial cypher.

Royal cyphers appear on some government buildings, impressed upon royal and state documents, and are used by governmental departments.  They may also appear on other governmental structures built under a particular ruler.  For example, the insignia of "N III" for Napoleon III is seen on some Paris bridges, such as the Pont au Change.

Commonwealth realms

The initialswhich had no set pattern or form of lettering laid downwere usually shown in company with the royal arms or crown as on the king's manors and palacessuch as those of Henry VIII on the gatehouse of St James's Palace. The purpose seems to have been simply to identify an individual sovereign, particularly on certain landmarks that he or she has commissioned, as the royal coat of arms in contrast was often used by successive monarchs and is therefore not distinct. The initials are furthermore used on government papers, duty stamps and similar objects, and are surmounted in England by a stylised version of the Tudor Crown or St Edward's Crown; in Scotland the Crown of Scotland is used instead.

Though royal symbols (including, most notably, the coat of arms, royal standards and great seals) differ among the 15 Commonwealth realms, as they are separate monarchies, the one sovereign uses the same cypher throughout all of his or her countries. Distinction continues to be made between the personal cypher and the simpler, more workaday public initials, the former being the sovereign's own monogram and the latter simply a means of identifying a reign. Nowadays, the initials are also called the royal cypher, but, to aid clarification, the monogram is referred to as the royal cypher interlaced and reversed.

Charles III

On 26 September 2022, Buckingham Palace unveiled the cypher of the new king, Charles III, that is gradually replacing the cypher of Elizabeth II in everyday use. Charles's Scottish cypher uses the Crown of Scotland instead.

Elizabeth II
The monarch's cypher is today usually surmounted by a stylised version of St. Edward's Crown. In Scotland as a result of a dispute, known as the Pillar Box War, over the correct title of the new monarch (Elizabeth I of England and Ireland was not a monarch of Scotland, so the new queen would have been Elizabeth I, not II in Scotland according to that view), after 1953 new post boxes carried only the Crown of Scotland image rather than the  cypher, which continued to be used in the rest of the United Kingdom and in other realms and territories.

The production of the cypher was an early step in the preparations for her coronation in 1953 as it had to be embroidered on to the uniforms of the Royal Household and on other articles. Cyphers for other members of the royal family are designed by the College of Arms or Court of the Lord Lyon and are subsequently approved by the monarch.

Canada

The royal cyphers have been incorporated by the Canadian Heraldic Authority into the various royal standards of Canada. The use in Canada of the reigning monarch's cypher, which is sometimes uniquely surrounded by a garland of maple leaves, is as a symbol not only of the sovereign him or herself, but of Canada's full sovereignty.

Australia
The royal cypher is also found on post offices and some government buildings in Australia.

Elsewhere

British royal cyphers are still visible on several public buildings and post boxes in the Republic of Ireland.

Other royal houses have also made use of royal or imperial cyphers. Ottoman sultans had a calligraphic signature, their tughra.

All the monarchs of Europe's six other surviving kingdoms use cyphers, with royal crowns above them. King Harald V of Norway uses the letter H crossed with the Arabic numeral 5; King Carl XVI Gustav of Sweden uses the letters C and G overlapping with the Roman numeral XVI below them; King Felipe VI of Spain uses the letter F with the Roman numeral; and Queen Margrethe II of Denmark uses the letter M with the Arabic numeral 2 and the letter R (for Regina) below it. King Philippe of the Belgians uses the letters P and F intertwined, referring to the fact that his name is Philippe in French and Philipp in German, but Filip in Dutch, the three main languages in Belgium. King Willem-Alexander of the Netherlands and his Queen Maxima share a joint cypher consisting of the letter W entwined with the letter M.

Gallery

See also

 H7 (monogram)
 Heraldic badge
 MacCormick v Lord Advocate
 Mon (emblem)
 Personal Flag of Queen Elizabeth II
 Pillar Box War
 Royal sign-manual
 Signum manus

References

Monarchy
Monarchy in Australia
Monarchy in Canada
Monograms
State ritual and ceremonies